"Another Night" is a song by German Eurodance and pop music project Real McCoy (also known as M.C. Sar & The Real McCoy). The single is featured on their hit album, Another Night (1995), which was the American release of the project's second album, Space Invaders. The song was written and produced in Germany by Juergen Wind (J. Wind) and Frank Hassas (Quickmix) in 1993 under the producer team name Freshline.

Initially a sleeper hit in Germany in 1993, it would go on to reach the top three in the United Kingdom and United States in late 1994. It also peaked at number one in Australia, Scotland, and Zimbabwe, as well as on the Canadian and US dance charts. In 2008, "Another Night" was ranked at number 91 in Billboard Magazine's Top 100 Songs of the First 50 Years of the Hot 100. Ten years later, commemorating the 60th anniversary of the Hot 100, "Another Night" ranked at position 117.

Background and release
"Another Night" was originally released in Europe in the Summer of 1993 through Hansa Records (BMG Berlin). At first the single was only a minor hit in Europe. It had peaked at No.18 in Germany but had barely managed to make the Top 100 in other countries in Europe. Thanks to the promotional efforts of BMG Canada, the single suddenly reached No.1 on the Canadian charts in the Spring of 1994. The success of the single in Canada caught the attention of Arista Records CEO Clive Davis who at the time had become interested in bringing another European music project to the US market after becoming successful with the Swedish pop group Ace of Base. Once a new deal was finalized between Arista and BMG, the project name was shortened to Real McCoy and an all new release of the single was quickly planned for Summer 1994. Thanks to the promotional efforts of Arista in 1994, "Another Night" quickly reached No.3 on the US charts and remained on the US chart for over 45 weeks. It was also certified Platinum by the Recording Industry Association of America. The single also achieved Platinum sales in Australia and Silver status in the United Kingdom.

Composition, vocals and lyrics
While singer Patricia "Patsy" Petersen stars in the music videos for the single, the actual vocals on the track were recorded with studio singer Karin Kasar. German rapper Olaf Jeglitza (O-Jay) wrote and performed the rap vocals on the single. "Another Night" was originally inspired by Roni Griffith's 1981 song "Desire", the Coca-Cola theme tune and Captain Hollywood Project's 1992 song "More and More." The song lyrics tell the story of a woman who longs to be with the anonymous individual she encounters every night in her dreams. The rap vocals represent the man's voice in the woman's head, saying the things she wants to hear and promising to fulfill her desires and cover her with his love. However, each dawn brings pain to the vocalist, as she realizes "when the night is gone, I'll be alone."

Chart performance
"Another Night" debuted on the Billboard Hot 100 at number 77 on the week ending 27 August 1994. On the week ending 12 November 1994, the single reached its peak position of number three. The song also brought the group the distinction of having the longest run at number three, or any place that is not number one on the Billboard Hot 100 (11 non-consecutive weeks). It stayed on the chart for 45 weeks. By the end of 1994, the single had sold approximately 700,000 copies in the US according to Nielsen Soundscan.

In Europe, "Another Night" was a number-one hit in Scotland, and made it to the top 10 in Belgium (4), Denmark (10), Finland (3), Ireland (6), Norway (6) and the United Kingdom, as well as on the Eurochart Hot 100, where it hit number ten. In the UK, it reached number two in its fourth week at the UK Singles Chart, on 13 November 1994. It was held off the top spot by Pato Banton's "Baby Come Back". Additionally, "Another Night" was a top 20 hit in France (20), Germany (18), Iceland (13) and the Netherlands (13). In Australia and Zimbabwe, it went to number-one, as well as on the Canadian RPM Dance/Urban chart and the US Billboard Dance Club Songs chart. It earned a gold record in New Zealand, a silver record in the UK, and a platinum record in both Australia and the US.

In 2017, to mark the 25th anniversary of the Mainstream Top 40/Pop Songs chart, Billboard magazine released a list of the 100 best-performing pop airplay songs since the chart's beginning in 1992. "Another Night" topped the list.

Critical reception
Upon the release, Larry Flick from Billboard described the song as a "instantly infectious and jaunty li'l rave/NRG jumper that may initially remind some of "What Is Love" by Haddaway. A close spin, however, reveals a frothy confection that stands on its own pop merits. Nicely contrasted male/female duet vocals kick lovely, as do peppy remixes [...]. Already wooing folks aboard, single has the strength to keep the glow of summer parties lingering for a long time to come." David Browne from Entertainment Weekly said it is "a swooshing glop of diva-on-a-downer voice, Eurotrash synths, and rapping." Dave Sholin from the Gavin Report wrote that "those of you into catchy, high-energy, pop creations from groups like the Captain Hollywood Project or Culture Beat will love this track." Rachel Cohen from The Heights named it the best dance track of the album, along with "Run Away". She described it as "fast-paced and energetic". noting that it has "a distinct beat and sound". Howard Cohen from Herald-Journal called it an "infectious tune, bubbling with strobe-like keyboards and melody". 

Dennis Hunt from Los Angeles Times felt it is "awfully catchy". In his weekly UK chart commentary, James Masterton said, "It stands out in many ways owing to the strange billing the act has." Alan Jones from Music Week gave the song five out of five, declaring it "a fiendish continental creation that's laid siege to Europe and is climbing the US Top 10." He added further, "A hugely commercial pop/dance confection with the usual male rap verse/female sung chorus combination that has proved so popular. File next to Whigfield." Wendi Cermak from The Network Forty viewed it as a "great dance record". The magazine also compared it to "Rhythm Is a Dancer" by Snap!. Stephen Yang from The Rice Thresher noted the "sugary catchy beats and glitzy synthesizers". James Hamilton from the RM Dance Update described it as an "ultra cheesy German galloper, with 'put your hands up in the air' rather than the title as its hook line" and a "deadly catchy chugging German pop lurcher". Milo Miles from Salon Magazine felt that the song "incorporate swank Philly-soul melodies in the manner of M People."

Retrospective response
Retrospectively, Bradley Torreano from AllMusic wrote that the song "is the biggest thing they have ever done; with its charming hooks, instantly recognizable keyboard part, and infectious rhythm, it might be one of the best dance songs to emerge out of the techno-pop explosion." Stopera and Galindo from BuzzFeed remarked that "this song is everything great about '90s dance songs combined into one song. So good." They ranked it number four in their list of "The 101 Greatest Dance Songs Of the '90s" in 2017. David Balls from Digital Spy declared it as "some of the finest Eurodance of the 1990s." Robbie Daw from Idolator described "Another Night" as a "marriage of memorable pop choruses sung by a charismatic female and gruff rhymes delivered by a tough-guy rapper, all laid over a thumping beat." In 2018, Stacker ranked it number-one in their list of "Best Pop Songs of the Last 25 Years", noting "Another Night" as "the #1 pop song of the modern era."

Music video
Two music videos were filmed for the single's release. In the US version for the single, Jeglitza is Real McCoy, the disc jockey of a pirate radio station powered by four men with handcycle-mounted generators. Petersen (lip-syncing Karin Kasar's vocals) is driving around town on her moped, mounting posters promoting McCoy's radio broadcasts while listening to the broadcast on a boombox. She is attracted to McCoy's voice and image, but has apparently never met him. As McCoy leaves his hidden studio after another night's broadcast, he walks by Petersen on her moped; recognizing him, she turns for a quick moment, and then rides on. This version was directed by Nigel Dick and filmed in London. Renee Graham of Boston Globe rated this version two and a half stars, saying that the band would become "consigned to cut-out bins." The video was published on YouTube in October 2009. It has amassed more than 114 million views as of April 2022.

The European music video was directed by Angel, and features two alien robot characters: one male and one female. They communicate with each other via videophone, their conversation intercut with dance sequences from black-and-white movies of the 1920s and 1930s, as well as color snippets of Jeglitza and Petersen performing the lyrics to the song. The robots are also able to view each other directly, the male with a binocular headset and the female with a telescope. As the song progresses, the stiff movements of the robots become more fluid and dance-like. At the end of the video, the two robots meet, dance, and walk away together, arm in arm. It was published on YouTube in October 2006. The video has received more than 1.7 million views as of April 2022.

Accolades

Charts

Weekly charts

Year-end charts

Decade-end charts

All-time charts

Certifications

Release history

See also
 List of number-one singles in Australia during the 1990s
 List of RPM number-one dance singles of 1994
 List of Billboard Mainstream Top 40 number-one songs of the 1990s
 List of number-one dance singles of 1994 (U.S.)

References

1993 singles
1993 songs
Bertelsmann Music Group singles
Black-and-white music videos
English-language German songs
Hansa Records singles
Logic Records singles
Music videos directed by Angel (director)
Music videos directed by Nigel Dick
Number-one singles in Australia
Number-one singles in Scotland
Number-one singles in Zimbabwe
Real McCoy (band) songs
Songs about nights